Mati Laur (born 17 June 1955, in Abja-Paluoja) is an Estonian historian. He has written and co-authored many textbooks about early modern Estonia. He has published a number of scholarly articles about eighteenth-century Estonia, which also was the subject of his Ph.D. thesis. Despite this narrow specialisation, he is professor of general history at the University of Tartu.

Together with Karsten Brüggemann, Laur is editor of the historical journal Forschungen zur baltischen Geschichte [Research on Baltic history].

External links
CV 

1955 births
Living people
People from Abja-Paluoja
20th-century Estonian historians
Historians of Estonia
Academic staff of the University of Tartu
Recipients of the Order of the White Star, 4th Class
21st-century Estonian historians